Bombelles is the name of an old French aristocratic family which originated from Lorraine. Members of the family later settled in Austria and Portugal. They held the title of Marquis in France and Count in Austria.

Notable members 
Jeanne Renee de Bombelles (1753–1828), composer
 Count Karl von Bombelles, master of Archduke Rudolf in 1877, and imperial custodian of the Empress of Mexico.
Marc Marie, Marquis de Bombelles (1744–1822), diplomat and bishop
His son Louis Philippe de Bombelles (1780–1843), diplomat
Charles-René de Bombelles (6 November 1784–30 May 1856), French émigré nobleman, soldier, and the third husband of Marie Louise, Duchess of Parma.

References

French-language surnames
French noble families